Beta Caeli (β Caeli, abbreviated to β Cae) is the Bayer designation for a star in the southern constellation of Caelum. It is a dim star but visible to the naked eye, having an apparent visual magnitude of 5.04. Based upon an annual parallax shift of 4.88 mas as seen from Earth, it is located 94 light years from the Sun. The star is moving away from the Sun with a radial velocity of +28.8 km/s.

This is a probable single-lined spectroscopic binary star system. The visible component has a stellar classification of F3 V or F3 IV, indicating it is either an F-type main-sequence star or a somewhat more evolved subgiant star, respectively. It has an estimated 1.3 times the mass of the Sun and about 1.3 times the Sun's radius. The star is 1.75 billion years old and has a high rate of spin with a projected rotational velocity of around 97.5 km/s.

The companion is likely to be a low-mass (0.2 ) star orbiting about 5 AU from the primary. This object may be the source of the X-ray emission coming from the same location.

References

External links
 HR 1503
 Image Beta Caeli

Binary stars
F-type main-sequence stars
F-type subgiants
Caeli, Beta
Caelum
Durchmusterung objects
Gliese and GJ objects
029992
021861
1503